Muhammad Taufeeq Butt is a Pakistani politician who had been a Member of the Provincial Assembly of the Punjab from August 2018 till January 2023. Previously, he was a Member of the Provincial Assembly of the Punjab, from May 2013 to May 2018.

Early life and education
He was born on 14 November 1969 in Gujranwala.

He received intermediate level education.

Political career

He was elected to the Provincial Assembly of the Punjab as a candidate of Pakistan Muslim League (Nawaz) (PML-N) from Constituency PP-96 (Gujranwala-VI) in 2013 Pakistani general election.

He was re-elected to Provincial Assembly of the Punjab as a candidate of PML-N from Constituency PP-56 (Gujranwala-VI) in 2018 Pakistani general election.

References

Living people
Punjab MPAs 2013–2018
1969 births
Pakistan Muslim League (N) MPAs (Punjab)
Punjab MPAs 2018–2023